CFAV Tillicum (YTM 555) is a harbour tug of the Queen`s Harbour Master.
She is stationed at CFB Esquimalt, on Vancouver Island.

The Queens`s Harbour Master operates ten other tugboats, five 45-ton  and five 250-ton  tugs, and two 140-ton s.

The Ville-class tugs rotate their kort nozzle for steering.  Tillicums nozzles are fixed and she uses 4 conventional rudders for steering.

References

Fleet of the Royal Canadian Navy
Harbor vessels of Canada
Tugboats of the Royal Canadian Navy
Auxiliary ships of the Royal Canadian Navy